Kristapor Ivanyan Military College, is a college and military educational institution based in Stepanakert and operated by the Artsakh Defense Army.

Background
It is named after Lieutenant General Kristapor Ivanyan, a veteran of the Great Patriotic War (1941–45) and the first Karabakh War, as well a key figure in the Military history of the Republic of Artsakh. The college is the equivalent to the Moscow Suvorov Military School in Russia, and the Monte Melkonian Military College in Armenia. In 2007, a contingent from the college became a permanent participant in the Shushi Liberation Day military parade on Renaissance Square. Notable visitors have included President of the National Assembly of Armenia Ararat Mirzoyan.

Students
Admission into the college starts in the 9th grade, with the principles and structure of an Armenian secondary school. Education is carried out on the basis of general education programs, with a number of highly specialized subjects. Applicants are subject to physical fitness tests upon arrival at the school. School pupils often visit to school open days. The school is currently co-ed, having accepted female cadets for the first time in 2015. The number was very small during the 2015-2016 school year, but only after the four-day war in 2016 did the number of girls increase. In 2017, Eva Ghazaryan became the first female graduate of college, later studying at the Armenak Khanperyants Military Aviation University.

See also 
 Artsakh Defense Army
 Armed Forces of Armenia
 Kristapor Ivanyan

References 

Military of the Republic of Artsakh
Military academies
Educational institutions established in 2001
2001 establishments in the Republic of Artsakh